Periplakin is a protein that in humans is encoded by the PPL gene.

The protein encoded by this gene is a component of desmosomes and of the epidermal cornified envelope in keratinocytes. The N-terminal domain of this protein interacts with the plasma membrane and its C-terminus interacts with intermediate filaments. Through its rod domain, this protein forms complexes with envoplakin. This protein may serve as a link between the cornified envelope and desmosomes as well as intermediate filaments. AKT1/PKB, a protein kinase mediating a variety of cell growth and survival signaling processes, is reported to interact with this protein, suggesting a possible role for this protein as a localization signal in AKT1-mediated signaling.

Interactions
PPL (gene) has been shown to interact with Keratin 8 and Envoplakin.

See also 
 List of target antigens in pemphigus

References

Further reading

External links 
 

Plakins